The Glowing Man is the fourteenth studio album by American experimental rock band Swans, released on June 17, 2016 on Young God and Mute. It is considered the third and final part of a three-album "trilogy", the other two parts being The Seer and To Be Kind, respectively.

The song "The World Looks Red/The World Looks Black" contains lyrics written by frontman Michael Gira that were used in the Sonic Youth song "The World Looks Red" in 1983; the music is new, with no relation to the earlier version. Swans and Sonic Youth both developed in the early 1980s post-punk/no wave scene of New York City, and Sonic Youth's Thurston Moore was an early member of Swans appearing on the live album Body to Body, Job to Job (recorded 1982–85, released 1991). The title track for The Glowing Man has previously been referred to as "Black Hole Man" and "Black-Eyed Man" and includes a section of "Bring the Sun / Toussaint L'Ouverture" from the 2014 album To Be Kind. The song "When Will I Return?" was uploaded to YouTube on May 27, 2016.

Prior to its appearance on The Glowing Man, "Frankie M." was part of Swans' live sets as early as 2014, its length and arrangements differing each time it was performed.

Critical reception

Upon its release, The Glowing Man was widely praised by music critics. At Metacritic, which assigns a normalized rating out of 100 to reviews from critics, the album received an average score of 81, based on 22 reviews, indicating "universal acclaim". Writing for Exclaim!, Griffin J. Elliot called the album "a meticulous exercise in the band's streamlining their abstract sound, taking what they've done before and playing it under a newer, grander spotlight." Saby Reyes-Kulkarni wrote for Pitchfork, "The love in [Gira's] music is as terrible as it is beautiful, a wrenching act of spiritual determination. Swans make this sound effortless, though, in a fitting end to a remarkable chapter of their career."

Accolades

Track listing

Personnel 
Adapted from the official Young God Records website:

Swans
 Michael Gira – vocals, electric and acoustic guitar
 Kristof Hahn – lap steel guitar, electric guitar, acoustic guitar, vocals
 Thor Harris – percussion, vibes and bells, hammered dulcimer
 Christopher Pravdica – bass guitar, vocals
 Phil Puleo – drums, hammered dulcimer, vocals
 Norman Westberg – electric guitar, vocals
Guests
 Bill Rieflin – drums, piano, synth, Mellotron, bass guitar, electric guitar, vocals
 Jennifer Gira – lead vocals on "When Will I Return?"
 Okkyung Lee – cello on "Cloud of Unknowing"
 Bach Norwood – double bass
 Kaela Sinclair – backing vocals
 Katrina Cain – backing vocals
 Buffi Jacobs – cello
 Daniel Hart – violin
 Gerald Jones – mandolin, banjo
 Stuart Mack – trumpet
 Joakim Toftgaard – trombone
 Rachel Woolf – flute

Charts

References

External links
 

2016 albums
Swans (band) albums
Albums produced by Michael Gira
Young God Records albums
Mute Records albums
Albums recorded at Sonic Ranch